Lusaka is the capital of Zambia. 

Lusaka may also refer to:

 Lusaka Province, one of the ten provinces of Zambia
 Lusaka District
 Roman Catholic Archdiocese of Lusaka, Zambia
 Diocese of Lusaka, Zambia, an Anglican bishopric
 University of Lusaka, Lusaka, Zambia
 Lusaka Open, a men's golf tournament from 1969 to 1979, played in Lusaka, Zambia
 Kenneth Lusaka (born 1963), Kenyan politician
 Paul J. F. Lusaka (1935–1996), Zambian politician and diplomat, President of the United Nations General Assembly in 1984